Udaipur Division is one of the administrative geographical unit, called a division,  of Rajasthan state, India. The division comprises six districts, namely, Banswara, Chittorgarh, Dungarpur, Rajsamand, Udaipur and Pratapgarh.

 
Divisions of Rajasthan